The fringed fruit-eating bat (Artibeus fimbriatus), is a species of bat native to South America.

Distribution and habitat
Fringed fruit-eating bats inhabit regions with tropical climates and thrive in areas with little rainfall and sunny days. This species is dependent on abiotic factors in the wild. It is found in Argentina, Brazil and Paraguay.

Behaviour and ecology

Their reproduction process is dependent on both the time of day and climatic factors. The process begins in warmer seasons with longer hours of daylight.

For scavenging, they mainly feed on fruits and seeds, but predominantly eat ficus and leafy bushes.

Threats
While not currently threatened with extinction, changes to the forests and forest community may lead to a steadily decline in the bat population.

References

Artibeus
Bats of South America
Bats of Brazil
Mammals of Argentina
Mammals of Paraguay
Mammals described in 1938
Taxa named by John Edward Gray